Francis Rivett (c 1596 – 6 April 1669) was an English landowner and politician who sat in the House of Commons  at various times between 1654 and 1660.

Rivett was probably admitted at Emmanuel College, Cambridge on 29 May 1612 and awarded BA in 1616.  In about 1649 Rivett purchased the estate of  King's Somborne from Richard Gifford.

In 1654, Rivett was elected Member of Parliament for Hampshire in the First Protectorate Parliament. He was elected MP for Stockbridge in the Third Protectorate Parliament in 1659. In 1660, Rivett was elected MP for Stockbridge  in the Convention Parliament.
 
Rivett's daughter Margery married Oliver St John of Farley Chamberlayne th whom the manor of King's Somborne passed.

References

 

1596 births
1669 deaths
Alumni of Emmanuel College, Cambridge
English landowners
People from South Derbyshire District
People from Test Valley
Year of birth uncertain
English MPs 1654–1655
English MPs 1659
English MPs 1660